Keldrick Arthur Dunn (born April 28, 1963) is a former American football tight end in the National Football League (NFL) for the St. Louis Cardinals, Tampa Bay Buccaneers, Washington Redskins, and the New York Jets. He played college football at Clemson University and was drafted in the fifth round of the 1985 . He is currently the Head Football Coach at Redan High School in Lithonia,  GA  (DeKalb County School District).

References

1963 births
Living people
American football tight ends
Clemson Tigers football players
Montreal Machine players
New England Patriots players
New York Giants players
St. Louis Cardinals (football) players
Washington Redskins players
People from Killeen, Texas
Players of American football from Texas
Tampa Bay Buccaneers players
New York Jets players